Kamianyi Brid may refer

 Kamianyi Brid, Baranivka Raion, a town in Zhytomyr Oblast
 Kamianyi Brid, Luhansk, a former village that is part of Luhansk since the 19th century